Operation River Falcon was a military operation in the Iraq War. From 25 to 27 July 2006, elements of the United States Army 2nd Brigade Combat Team, 4th Infantry Division (including elements of the 2nd Battalion, 8th Infantry Regiment, and the 1st Battalion, 10th Cavalry Regiment) conducted Operation River Falcon in and around the town of Sayifiyeh in Iraq. The operation was aimed at denying terrorists the use of the town as a safe haven, disrupting insurgent attacks on Coalition and Iraqi Army/Police, and on collecting and destroying insurgent munitions.

Background of the Operation
Sayifiyah initially was a resort-style region for Iraqi Sunnis during the regime of Saddam Hussein. Sayifiyah is located southeast of Baghdad on the Tigris River, and was considered a sanctuary for terrorists. Some difficult regions to the northwest caused security force leadership to shift their focus to those areas, leaving the town of Sayifiyah unguarded. The Operation was conducted to prevent terrorists from moving freely throughout the town as well as to conduct humanitarian efforts for its residents.

Details of the Operation
Soldiers departed for Sayifiyah 25 July 2006 and rode into town in the pre-dawn hours inside Humvees and M2 Bradleys in search of terrorists. Five men, all of whom were on a suspect list, were detained during the initial mission. Soldiers continued searching houses and introducing themselves to the town's residents, who were unsure of the soldiers' reasons for coming into town. The soldiers set up a temporary operating base on the outskirts of town.

Soldiers continued patrolling the streets, looking for anything out of the ordinary. One platoon was tasked with combing a thick date palm grove in the Abasha Farms section of town and unearthed multiple vehicles suspected of being used to transport weapons and car bombs. One man was detained after soldiers witnessed him attempting to emplace a roadside bomb in front of a traveling combat patrol. The detainee was caught with detonation cord and an ignition battery.
Soldiers discovered numerous defensive roadside bombs in front of known safe houses. The bombs were large and buried underneath the concrete road. An Explosive Ordnance Disposal team conducted a controlled detonation of the bombs.

Soldiers set out on the final day of the operation to meet the residents and hand out humanitarian aid bags, food, and TIPS cards so the residents could inform Multi-National Division – Baghdad soldiers or Iraqi Security Forces if terrorist activity was occurring in the area.

References

External links
Multi-National Force – Iraq

Military operations of the Iraq War involving the United States
Military operations of the Iraq War involving Iraq
Military operations of the Iraq War in 2006